Dr. Golam Yazdani (1917–2009) was a controversial Bengali politician, six-time MLA, three-time MP and cabinet minister in West Bengal. He was in jail for around three years and went underground for twenty months.

Early years
Dr. Golam Yazdani, son of Moulvi Raisuddin Ahmed, was born at Barogachi in Malda district in January 1917. He qualified as a doctor, passing M.B.B.S., DTM & H, and D.G.O. from Calcutta Medical College, Calcutta School of Tropical Medicine and Chittaranjan Seva Sadan, all at Kolkata.

He married Maleka Begum in 1980 and had two sons.

Political career
He won the Kharba seat as an independent candidate in 1957, 1962, 1967 and 1969, and as a CPI(M) candidate in 1971. He did not contest as a candidate in 1972 and won it back as an independent candidate in 1977.

At that time Kharba assembly segment was part of Raiganj. Dr. Golam Yazdani successfully contested the Raiganj parliamentary seat as a Congress candidate in 1980, 1984 and 1989.
  
He was a cabinet minister for civil defence and passport in West Bengal from 1969 to 1970.

He was in emergency medical service during World War II, from 1943 to 1947. He was imprisoned for political reasons from 1971 to 1974, and went underground during the emergency for 20 months.
 
He contributed substantially for the establishment of Chanchal College in 1969.

Dr. Golam Yazdani's popularity was because of his being a doctor and his social work.

Death
Dr. Golam Yazdani died at his Chanchal residence on 14 May 2009. He was 93. He was survived by two sons. His elder son Alberuni was active in politics in the Congress party. Alberuni later contested in 2011 Assembly elections as an independent candidate.

References 

West Bengal MLAs 1957–1962
West Bengal MLAs 1962–1967
West Bengal MLAs 1967–1969
West Bengal MLAs 1969–1971
West Bengal MLAs 1977–1982
Indian National Congress politicians
People from Malda district
Lok Sabha members from West Bengal
State cabinet ministers of West Bengal
1917 births
2009 deaths
India MPs 1980–1984
India MPs 1984–1989
India MPs 1989–1991
People from Uttar Dinajpur district
20th-century Bengalis
21st-century Bengalis